Regional Air Services is an airline based in Arusha, Tanzania. It is the Tanzanian division of Airkenya and operates domestic services and charter flights in East and Southern Africa.

History
The airline was established in 1997 and started operations in July 1997. It is wholly owned by Airkenya Aviation.

Services
Scheduled services are operated to Arusha, Kilimanjaro, Dar es Salaam, Zanzibar, Manyara, Seronera, Grumeti, Fort Ikoma, Kogatende, Lobo, Sasakwa, Ndutu, and Tarime. Charter flights are also operated throughout the country.

Fleet

The Regional Air Services (Tanzania) fleet comprises the following aircraft (as of November 2018):

References

External links

Official Website

Airlines of Tanzania
Airlines established in 1997
1997 establishments in Tanzania